Rosalie is a village in Dominica.  It is located in Saint David Parish at the northern end of Rosalie Bay, on the central east coast of the island, close to the mouth of the Rosalie River.

References

External links

Populated places in Dominica
Saint David Parish, Dominica